Hiram Lincoln Church  (1863–1926) was an American baseball player. He played for the 1890 Brooklyn Gladiators in the American Association. He also played college ball at Syracuse University.

External links

 "1889 Oneida Indians"

1863 births
1926 deaths
Major League Baseball outfielders
19th-century baseball players
Brooklyn Gladiators players
Oneida Indians players
Syracuse Orangemen baseball players
Baseball players from New York (state)
People from Oswego County, New York